Airport Mania: First Flight is a 2008 time management game, that was jointly created by Reflexive Entertainment and South Wind Games. The player manages planes as they come in for landings. The game shifts through eight different airports of play, and the levels have different challenges, including a presidential plane (which has to land very quickly).

Airport Mania was released on iOS in April 2008 and during that year reached the number 1 overall ranking in iTunes in 12 countries including Canada, the United Kingdom, and Hong Kong.

A version was also made for WiiWare and was released in North America on November 29, 2010, and in Europe on June 16, 2011. There is also a version for DSiWare which was released in North America on April 25, 2011, and June 16, 2011, in Europe.

A sequel, Airport Mania 2: Wild Trips, was released on Windows, Macintosh, iOS, and Android in 2011.

Reception

References

2008 video games
Android (operating system) games
IOS games
Time management video games
Windows games
WiiWare games
DSiWare games
MacOS games
Reflexive Entertainment games
Video games developed in the United States
Single-player video games